Lycium torreyi is a species of flowering plant in the nightshade family known by the common name Torrey wolfberry. It is native to northern Mexico and the southwestern United States from California to Texas.

This plant is a spreading shrub reaching  in maximum height. It may be spiny or spineless. It may form thickets. They are borne in fascicles in the leaf axils.

This plant occurs in the Chihuahuan Desert, where it is characteristic of the mesquite-fourwing saltbush plant community. Other plants in the habitat may include creosotebush, tarbush, agave, and alkali sacaton.

References

External links
The Nature Conservancy

torreyi